An agate (US) or ruby (UK) is a unit of typographical measure. It is 5.5 typographical points, or about  inch (1.94 mm). It can refer either to the height of a line of type or to a font that is 5.5 points. An  is commonly used to display statistical data or legal notices in newspapers. It is considered to be the smallest point size that can be printed on newsprint and remain legible.

Due to the small size of agate compared to typical newspaper body text that might be 8 to 10 points and due to its use for statistical, stock, racing or other table uses, the term "agate" may also refer to tables and texts using this point size. The general description "agate" refers to the collection of miscellaneous tables, stock tables, horse racing and sports tables and so forth that may be in a newspaper.

From the American Dictionary of Printing and Bookmaking (1894):

See also
 Traditional point-size names

References

Typography
Units of length
Typesetting